Fyodor Vasilyevich Kostyayev (20 February 1878 – 27 September 1925) was a military officer in the Russian Imperial Army and following the October Revolution in the Red Army.

Biography
Born to an Orthodox family from the Russian nobility in Courland Governorate. He received his education in Orenburg Nepluyevsky Cadet Corps. In 1899 he graduated from the Mykolaiv Engineering School. He joined service on September 1, 1896, served in the 2nd Caucasian Sapper and 4th Railway Battalions. Since August 9, 1899 he was Podporuchik and since August 13, 1901 Poruchik. He participated in the Russo-Japanese War of 1904-1905.

In 1905 he graduated from the Nikolaev Academy of the General Staff for the first category, captain since May 28, 1905. The censored command of the company served from November 8, 1905 to December 14, 1906 in the Life Guards of the St. Petersburg Regiment. On January 10, 1907 he was promoted to the assistant to the senior adjutant of the headquarters of the Irkutsk Military District.  On March 27, 1911 he was promoted to the assistant to the senior adjutant of the headquarters of the Vilno Military District.

In 1914 for five months he was a staff officer for office work and assignments under the management of the Quartermaster general of the Supreme Commander-in-Chief's staff. On December 6, 1914 he was promoted to colonel. From December 31, 1914 he served as chief of staff of the 30th Infantry Division. From February 1, 1916  commander of the 32nd Siberian Rifle Regiment. From January 1917  Chief of Staff of the 17th Siberian Rifle Division. From August 7, 1917 to November 1917 he was Chief of Staff of the 1st Siberian Army Corps. In 1917, he was promoted to the rank of Major-General, commanded the 132nd Infantry Division. From December 16, 1917 and before demobilization he was at the disposal of the Chief of Staff of the armies of the Western Front.

In 1918 he became part of the newly formed Red Army. He was chief of staff of the Pskov district. In May–June 1918 he served as the head of the Petrograd division. In September–October 1918 he was Chief of Staff of the Northern Front. From October 1918 to June 1919 he became Chief of Staff of the Revolutionary Military Council of the Republic, practically the supreme army commander. In the summer of 1919 he was arrested together with the commander-in-chief Jukums Vācietis.

Since September 1919 he taught at the Military Academy. In 1921-1923 he was a member and military representative in the commission for the establishment of the state border with Poland, in 1924-1925 - chairman of the USSR commission for the establishment of the state border with Finland. Since May 22, 1920 - full-time teacher of statistics and geography of the Military Academy of the Red Army. He was in charge of the Department of Military Geography and the Service of the General Staff.

References

Imperial Russian Army generals
Soviet generals
Russian military personnel of World War I
People of the Russian Civil War
Russian military personnel of the Russo-Japanese War
People from Courland Governorate
People from Jelgava
1872 births
1925 deaths